Eva Birnerová and Lucie Hradecká were the defending champions but Hradecká decided not to participate. 

Birnerová teamed up with Alizé Cornet, but had to withdraw due to the Czech's right thigh injury.

Jill Craybas and Julia Görges won the title, defeating Anna-Lena Grönefeld and Petra Martić in the final with the score 6–7(4–7), 6–4, [11–9].

Seeds

Draw

Draw

References
 Main Draw

Gastein Ladies - Doubles
2012 Doubles
Gast
Gast